Roro may refer to:

Geography
Roro, Chad, a sub-prefecture in Chad
 Rörö, a locality in Öckerö Municipality, Västra Götaland County, Sweden

Transport
 Roll-on/roll-off, a type of ship that carries wheeled cargo that can be driven on and off the vessel
 Intermodal container, or RO/RO, a large shipping container that can be used on ships, trains, and trucks
 Rolling highway, known in India as RORO, a system of transporting road trucks by rail

Other uses
 Roro (name)
 Rongorongo, (ISO 15924: Roro), a system of glyphs discovered on Easter Island
 Roro language, a dialect of the Waima language spoken in Papua New Guinea
 Rosario Salazar, nicknamed Roro, a character on the American TV series Will & Grace
 Roro Jonggrang, Javanese popular legend